The Abbaye aux Dames ("Ladies' Abbey") was the first Benedictine nunnery in Saintes in Charente-Maritime in France. The abbey was founded in 1047 by Geoffrey II, Count of Anjou, and his wife Agnes. Agnes later retired to the nunnery and died there. 

One of its abbesses was Agnès of Barbezieux (1134–1174), whose relative, Eleanor of Aquitaine, was a generous donor to the abbey.

Madame de Montespan was educated here. 

It is located next to the town's Arch of Germanicus and was classified a monument historique in 1948.

The abbey church, Sainte-Marie-des-Dames, dates from the 12th century.

Pictures

See also
 History of medieval Arabic and Western European domes

References

External links
 Abbaye aux Dames - official website

Buildings and structures in Charente-Maritime
Monuments historiques of Nouvelle-Aquitaine
Benedictine nunneries in France
Churches in Charente-Maritime
Tourist attractions in Charente-Maritime
Saintes, Charente-Maritime